Berezovka is a rural locality (a village) in Aitovsky Selsoviet, Bizhbulyaksky District, Bashkortostan, Russia. The population was 7 as of 2010. There are 2 streets.

Geography 
Berezovka is located 36 km southwest of Bizhbulyak (the district's administrative centre) by road. Alexeyevka is the nearest rural locality.

References 

Rural localities in Bizhbulyaksky District